Chrysodema is a genus of beetles in the family Buprestidae, containing the following species:

 Chrysodema akiyamai Holynski, 1994
 Chrysodema alberti Lander, 2000
 Chrysodema andamana Kerremans, 1895
 Chrysodema antennata Saunders, 1874
 Chrysodema apoensis (Kurosawa, 1979)
 Chrysodema auroplagiata Deyrolle, 1864
 Chrysodema aurostriata Saunders, 1866
 Chrysodema badenii (Saunders, 1874)
 Chrysodema bifoveolata Holynski, 1994
 Chrysodema borneensis Kerremans, 1909
 Chrysodema celebensis Kerremans, 1909
 Chrysodema claudinae Lander, 2000
 Chrysodema continentalis Holynski, 1994
 Chrysodema coolsi Holynski, 1994
 Chrysodema costata Thomson, 1879
 Chrysodema cyanicollis Kerremans, 1900
 Chrysodema dalmanni Eschcholtz in Mannerheim, 1837
 Chrysodema danterina Gigli, 2007
 Chrysodema deyrollei Saunders, 1874
 Chrysodema doriana (Dohrn, 1873)
 Chrysodema elongata Kerremans, 1900
 Chrysodema excellens Théry, 1923
 Chrysodema eximia Laporte & Gory, 1835
 Chrysodema flavicornis Saunders, 1874
 Chrysodema florensis Lansberge, 1880
 Chrysodema foraminifera Lansberge, 1879
 Chrysodema fucata Deyrolle, 1864
 Chrysodema furcata Kerremans, 1919
 Chrysodema impressicollis Laporte & Gory, 1835
 Chrysodema indica Kerremans, 1909
 Chrysodema iris (Kerremans, 1898)
 Chrysodema jucunda Laporte & Gory, 1835
 Chrysodema lethierryi Théry, 1923
 Chrysodema lewisii Saunders, 1873
 Chrysodema lottinii (Boisduval, 1835)
 Chrysodema malacca Deyrolle, 1864
 Chrysodema marinduquensis (Kurosawa, 1979)
 Chrysodema mniszechii Deyrolle, 1864
 Chrysodema moluensis Novak, 2010
 Chrysodema neefi Lander, 2003
 Chrysodema purpureicollis Saunders, 1874
 Chrysodema purpureoimpressa Deyrolle, 1864
 Chrysodema pyrostictica (Snellen van Vollenhoven, 1864)
 Chrysodema pyrothorax (Snellen van Vollenhoven, 1864)
 Chrysodema radians (Guérin-Ménéville, 1830)
 Chrysodema revisa (Gemminger & Harold, 1869)
 Chrysodema robusta Deyrolle, 1864
 Chrysodema rubifrons Deyrolle, 1864
 Chrysodema ruficornis Obenberger, 1928
 Chrysodema sainvali Holynski, 1994
 Chrysodema schmeltzii (Saunders, 1874)
 Chrysodema sibuyanica Fisher, 1924
 Chrysodema simplex Waterhouse, 1887
 Chrysodema smaragdula (Olivier, 1790)
 Chrysodema sonnerati Laporte & Gory, 1835
 Chrysodema subrevisa Thomson, 1879
 Chrysodema swierstrae Lansberge, 1883
 Chrysodema terabayashii Lander, 2003
 Chrysodema ulfi Lander, 2003
 Chrysodema vanderraadi Hulstaert, 1923
 Chrysodema variipennis Saunders, 1874
 Chrysodema ventralis Waterhouse, 1885
 Chrysodema walkeri (Waterhouse, 1892)
 Chrysodema wallaceae Holynski, 1994
 Chrysodema wallacei Deyrolle, 1864
 Chrysodema yasumatsui Kurosawa, 1954

References

 
Buprestidae genera